Qeshlaq-e Hajj Aymanlu Mahteman (also Romanized as Qeshlāq-e Ḩājj Aymānlū Maḥteman) is a village in Qeshlaq-e Shomali Rural District, in the Central District of Parsabad County, Ardabil Province, Iran. At the 2006 census, its population was 242, in 47 families.

References 

Towns and villages in Parsabad County